Campodeinae is a subfamily of two-pronged bristletails in the family Campodeidae. There are about 12 genera and at least 70 described species in Campodeinae.

Genera
These 12 genera belong to the subfamily Campodeinae:

 Campodea Westwood, 1842 i c g
 Clivocampa Allen, 1994 i c g
 Condeicampa Ferguson, 1996 i c g
 Eumesocampa Silvestri, 1933 i c g
 Haplocampa Silvestri, 1912 i c g b
 Litocampa Silvestri, 1933 i c g
 Meiocampa Silvestri, 1933 i c g
 Metriocampa Silvestri, 1911 i c g
 Orientocampa Allen, 2002 i c g
 Parallocampa Silvestri, 1933 i c g
 Podocampa Silvestri, 1932 i c g
 Tricampa Silvestri, 1933 i c g

Data sources: i = ITIS, c = Catalogue of Life, g = GBIF, b = Bugguide.net

References

Further reading

 
 
 

Diplura
Arthropod subfamilies